Tapinoma aberrans is a species of ant in the genus Tapinoma. Described by Santschi in 1911, the species is endemic to Madagascar.

References

Tapinoma
Hymenoptera of Africa
Insects described in 1911